Leptogium sphaerosporum is a species of corticolous (bark-dwelling), foliose lichen in the family Collemataceae. Found in Nepal, it was formally described as a new species in 2010 by Per Magnus Jørgensen and Louise Olley. Here, in a shady and humid  mixed broad-leaved forest, it was found growing on the bark of Alnus nepalensis. The ascospores are spheroid, muriform (divided into chambers) with rounded tips and have dimensions of 19–27 by 14–19 μm. Leptogium sphaerosporum is similar to Leptogium pedicellatum, but the latter species is distinguished by its ellipsoid (not spheroid) ascospores that measure 25–30 by 10–15 μm.

References

sphaerosporum
Lichen species
Lichens of Asia
Lichens described in 2010
Taxa named by Per Magnus Jørgensen